Optogenetics began with methods to alter neuronal activity with light, using e.g. channelrhodopsins. In a broader sense, optogenetic approaches also include the use of genetically encoded biosensors to monitor the activity of neurons or other cell types by measuring fluorescence or bioluminescence. Genetically encoded calcium indicators (GECIs) are used frequently to monitor neuronal activity, but other cellular parameters such as membrane voltage or second messenger activity can also be recorded optically. The use of optogenetic sensors is not restricted to neuroscience, but plays increasingly important roles in immunology, cardiology and cancer research.

History 
The first experiments to measure intracellular calcium levels via protein expression were based on aequorin, a bioluminescent protein from the jellyfish Aequorea. To produce light, however, this enzyme needs the 'fuel' compound coelenteracine, which has to be added to the preparation. This is not practical in intact animals, and in addition, the temporal resolution of bioluminescence imaging is relatively poor (seconds-minutes). The first genetically encoded fluorescent calcium indicator (GECI) to be used to image activity in an animal was cameleon, designed by Atsushi Miyawaki, Roger Tsien and coworkers in 1997. Cameleon was first used successfully in an animal by Rex Kerr, William Schafer and coworkers to record from neurons and muscle cells of the nematode C. elegans. Cameleon was subsequently used to record neural activity in flies and zebrafish. In mammals, the first GECI to be used in vivo was GCaMP, first developed by Nakai and coworkers in 2001. GCaMP has undergone numerous improvements, notably by a team of scientists at the Janelia Farm Research Campus (GENIE project, HHMI), and GCaMP6 in particular has become widely used in neuroscience. Very recently, G protein-coupled receptors have been harnessed to generate a series of highly specific indicators for various neurotransmitters.

Advantages of optogenetic sensors 

 can be targeted to specific classes of cells (e.g. astrocytes or pyramidal cells). This allows for optical read-out without spatial resolution, e.g. fiber photometry from deep brain areas.
 can be targeted to sub-cellular compartments (e.g. synapses, organelles, nucleus) by fusing the indicator protein with specific anchoring domains, retention signals or intrabodies.
 work in a variety of species (nematodes, insects, fish, mammals) and in cell culture systems (FLIPR assay)
 can be delivered by viral vectors (e.g. rAAV)
can be used to record the activity of thousands of neurons at the same time

Drawbacks, limitations 

 will buffer the measured ion or protein, potentially interfering with cellular signaling
 are subject to photobleaching, compromising long-term measurements
 can be toxic when expressed at very high concentration
 require highly sensitive cameras or laser scanning microscopes
 some GPCR-based sensors are sensitive to polarization
 most indicators are green fluorescent, making it difficult to measure several cellular parameters simultaneously (multiplexing).

Classes of genetically encoded indicators 

Indicators have been designed to measure ion concentrations, membrane potential, neurotransmitters, and various intracellular signaling molecules. The following list provides only examples for each class; many more have been published.

Intracellular signaling:

 Genetically encoded calcium indicators (GECI): A large class of tools, based on natural calcium binding proteins (calmodulin, troponin). Different affinities, kinetics, and colors (green, red) available. Read-out via fluorescence intensity (single wavelength indicators), FRET or BRET. Have been targeted to various organelles. Current version: JGCaMP8
 Genetically encoded chloride indicators: Clomeleon
 Genetically encoded potassium indicators: GINKO2
 Genetically encoded indicators for intracellular pH (GEPhI): CypHer
 Genetically encoded voltage indicators (GEVI): ArcLight
 Genetically encoded vesicle fusion sensors: Synapto-pHluorin, Synaptophysin-pHluorin
 Genetically encoded cAMP sensors: EPAC
 Genetically encoded ATP sensors: QUEEN-37C
 Genetically encoded kinase activity sensors:  CaMui, SmURFP
 Genetically encoded Small G-protein sensors: FRas
Neurotransmitters and other extracellular signals:
 Genetically encoded glutamate sensors: GluSnFR
 Genetically encoded GABA sensors: iGABASnFR
 Genetically encoded dopamine sensors: dLight1, GRAB-DA
 Genetically encoded serotonin sensors: GRAB5-HT, sDarken
Genetically encoded norepinephrine sensors: GRABNE
Genetically encoded sensor for endocannabinoid activity: GRABeCB2.0
Genetically encoded sensor for orexin/hypocretin neuropeptides: OxLight1
Genetically encoded sensor for lactate: eLACCO1.1

External links 
 Fluorescent Biosensor Database, a fairly complete searchable list of published sensors and their basic properties, maintained by Jin Zhang's lab at UCSD.
 Fluorescent Biosensors available on Addgene, a nonprofit plasmid repository.

References 

Neuroscience
Biological techniques and tools
Optics